Nycteola is a genus of moths of the family Nolidae.

Species
 Nycteola aroa (Bethune-Baker, 1906)
 Nycteola asiatica (Krulikovsky, 1904)
 Nycteola avola (Bethune-Baker, 1906)
 Nycteola baeopis (Turner, 1906)
 Nycteola brunneicosta (Bethune-Baker, 1906)
 Nycteola cana (Hampson, 1912)
 Nycteola canaphaea Holloway, 2003
 Nycteola canoides Holloway, 1979
 Nycteola cinereana Neumoegen & Dyar, 1893
 Nycteola columbana (Turner, 1925)
 Nycteola columbiana (H. Edwards, 1873)
 Nycteola coreana (Leech, 1900)
 Nycteola costalis Sugi, 1959
 Nycteola degenerana (Hübner, [1799])
 Nycteola dufayi Sugi, 1982
 Nycteola eremostola Dufay, 1961
 Nycteola exophila (Meyrick, 1888)
 Nycteola fasciosa (Moore, 1888)
 Nycteola fletcheri Rindge, 1961
 Nycteola frigidana (Walker, 1863)
 Nycteola gandzhana Obraztsov, 1953
 Nycteola glaucus (Wileman & West, 1929)
 Nycteola indica (Felder, 1874)
 Nycteola indicatana (Walker, 1863)
 Nycteola indicatella (Berio, 1957)
 Nycteola kebea (Bethune-Baker, 1906)
 Nycteola kuldzhana Obraztsov, 1953
 Nycteola malachitis (Hampson, 1912)
 Nycteola mangifera (Tams, 1938)
 Nycteola mauritia (de Joannis, 1906)
 Nycteola mesoplaga (Hampson, 1905)
 Nycteola metaspilella (Walker, 1866) (syn: Nycteola scriptana (Walker, 1863))
 Nycteola minutum (Turner, 1902)
 Nycteola nolalella (Walker, 1866)
 Nycteola oblongata (Mell, 1943)
 Nycteola poliophaea (Hampson, 1907)
 Nycteola polycyma (Turner, 1899)
 Nycteola pseudoindica Holloway, 2003
 Nycteola pseudonilotica Holloway, 1979
 Nycteola revayana (Scopoli, 1772)
 Nycteola siculana (Fuchs, 1899)
 Nycteola sinuosa (Moore, 1888)
 Nycteola svecicus (Bryk, 1941)
 Nycteola symmicta (Turner, 1902)
 Nycteola triangularis Gaede, 1937
 Nycteola underwoodi (Druce, 1901)
 Nycteola virescens (Hampson, 1902)

References

Chloephorinae